Switzerland competed at the 1984 Summer Paralympics in Stoke Mandeville, Great Britain and New York City, United States. 43 competitors from Switzerland won 43 medals including 18 gold, 13 silver and 12 bronze and finished 16th in the medal table.

See also 
 Switzerland at the Paralympics
 Switzerland at the 1984 Summer Olympics

References 

1984
1984 in Swiss sport
Nations at the 1984 Summer Paralympics